Tenuidactylus longipes, also known as Nikolsky's long-toed gecko or the long-legged thin-toed gecko, is a species of gecko that is found in Iran and southern Turkmenistan. The subspecies microlepis is sometimes considered a distinct species.

References 

Tenuidactylus
Reptiles described in 1896
Taxa named by Alexander Nikolsky